The 1992 Individual Speedway World Championship was the 47th edition of the official World Championship to determine the world champion rider.

Gary Havelock scored 14 points to become England's first Speedway World Champion since Michael Lee in 1980. Sweden's Per Jonsson, the 1990 World Champion, finished second with 11 points with Denmark's Gert Handberg third on 10 points. 

Triple World Champion Hans Nielsen failed to qualify for a World Final for the first time since 1979 after only finishing 12th in the Nordic Final.

Overseas Qualification

Australian Final 
 26 January 1992
  Adelaide - North Arm Speedway
 Referee:  Sam Bass
First 4 to Commonwealth final plus 1 reserve

New Zealand Qualification

Danish Final
May 16 & 17, 1992
 - 2 Rounds (Uhre and Holsted)
First 5 to Nordic final plus 1 reserve
Hans Nielsen seeded to Nordic Final

British Final
May 17, 1992
 Coventry, Brandon Stadium
First 10 to Commonwealth final plus 1 reserve

Swedish Final
May 19, 20 & 21, 1992
 - 3 Rounds (Målilla, Hagfors & Örebro)
First 4 to Nordic final plus 1 reserve
Henrik Gustafsson seeded to Nordic final

Commonwealth Final
May 31, 1992
 - King's Lynn, Norfolk Arena
First 11 to Overseas final plus 1 reserve

Nordic Final
June 14, 1992
 - Elgane, Elgane Speedway
First 9 to World Semi-final plus 1 reserve

Overseas Final
June 14, 1992
 - Coventry, Brandon Stadium
First 9 to World Semi-final plus 1 reserve

Continental Qualification

World Semi-Final #1
August 9, 1992
 - Bradford, Odsal Stadium
First 8 to World final plus 1 reserve

World Semi-Final #2
August 15, 1992
 - Wiener Neustadt, ÖAMTC Zweigverein
First 7 to World final plus 1 reserve
Sławomir Drabik seeded to World Final

World final
August 29, 1992
 Wrocław, Olympic Stadium

References

1992
World Individual
1992 in Polish speedway
Speedway competitions in Poland